Toru Dutt (4 March 1856 – 30 August 1877) was an Indian Bengali translator and poet from British India, who wrote in English and French. She is among the founding figures of Indo-Anglian literature, alongside Henry Louis Vivian Derozio (1809–1831), Manmohan Ghose (1869–1924), and Sarojini Naidu (1879–1949). She is known for her volumes of poetry in English, Sita, A Sheaf Gleaned in French Fields (1876) and Ancient Ballads and Legends of Hindustan (1882), and for a novel in French, Le Journal de Mademoiselle d'Arvers (1879). Her poems explore themes of loneliness, longing, patriotism and nostalgia. Dutt died at the age of 21.

Biography

Early life and education
Toru Dutt was born in Calcutta on 4 March 1856 to a Bengali family, which had converted to Christianity. Her father was Govind Chandra Dutt and her mother was Kshetramoni Dutt (née Mitter), of the Rambagan Dutt family. The Dutt family was one of the first Calcutta families to be strongly influenced by the presence of Christian missionaries. Toru Dutt's grandfather Rasamay Dutt and her father both held important positions in the colonial government. Her cousin Romesh Chandra Dutt was also a writer and Indian civil servant. Dutt's father converted to Christianity in 1862, when Dutt was six years old. Her mother initially resisted conversion, but eventually became a practising Christian as well. Both of Dutt's parents published some writing: her father wrote poetry and her mother published a translation into Bengali of a religious monograph.

Toru was the youngest child of three, after sister Aru and brother Abju. She and her siblings spent most of their childhood in Calcutta, splitting their time between a house in the city and a garden house in the suburb of Baugmaree. Dutt was educated at home by her father and by the Indian Christian tutor Babu Shib Chunder Banerjee, learning French and English, and eventually Sanskrit, in addition to her first language, Bengali. During this time, she learnt John Milton's epic poem of Christian allegory Paradise Lost by heart. She also learned stories of ancient India from her mother.

Abju,Toru's brother died when he was eleven years old and Aru died due to consumption on 23 July 1874

Life in Europe
In 1869, when Dutt was 13, Dutt's family left India, making her and her sister some of the first Bengali girls to travel by sea to Europe. The family spent four years living in Europe, one in France and three in England. They also visited Italy and Germany.

They first lived in France, from 1869 to 1870, in the south and in Paris. Dutt studied French in Nice and was briefly a student at a boarding school. In 1870, the family lived in Onslow Square, Brompton, London, where Dutt studied music. In 1871, they moved to Cambridge, where they remained until 1873.

In 1872, the University of Cambridge offered a lecture series, "Higher Lectures for Women", which Toru Dutt attended with her sister Aru. At the time, women were not entitled to join the University of Cambridge and opportunities for higher education were limited. This was a chance for women to access University lectures, set up by a group that included the philosopher Henry Sidgwick and the suffragist Millicent Garrett Fawcett. "Lectures for Ladies" became Newnham College in 1871, but Toru Dutt did not herself matriculate as a member, presumably because she was living in Cambridge and had no need for college accommodation. Her correspondence refers, however, to Merton Hall, the early name of Newnham College, and to Miss Clough as Principal of Newnham College. While not a member of a Cambridge college, Dutt would have had access to the college's intellectual discussions and critical thinking. At the end of 1872, Toru met and befriended Mary Martin, daughter of Reverend John Martin of Sidney Sussex College. The friendship developed further in correspondence after Toru's return to India.

The family left Cambridge in 1873, living in St Leonards, Sussex from April to November 1873, and then returning to Calcutta.

Later life

When Toru Dutt returned to Calcutta in 1873 at the age of 17, she found it challenging to return to a culture that now seemed "an unhealthy place both morally and physically speaking" to her Europeanized and Christianized eyes. Her sister Aru died of consumption in 1872, aged twenty. Three years after returning, she wrote to Mary Martin, "I have not been to one dinner party or any party at all since we left Europe," and "If any friend of my grandmother happens to see me, the first question is, if I am married." Both remarks express frustration with what she found to be a restrictive and conservative society. However, she also recognized that Europe could not replace India as her true home. She took consolation in reinvigorating her studies of Sanskrit with her father and hearing her mother's stories and songs about India.

Like both her siblings, Toru Dutt died of consumption (tuberculosis), at the age of 21 on 30 August 1877.

Writing
Toru Dutt was a natural linguist. In her short life she became proficient in Bengali, English, French and later Sanskrit. She left behind an impressive collection of prose and poetry. Her two novels, the unfinished Bianca or The Young Spanish Maiden in English and Le Journal de Mademoiselle d’Arvers in French, were based outside India with non-Indian protagonists. Her poetry appears in A Sheaf Gleaned in French Fields, consisting of translations into English of French poetry and Ancient Ballads and Legends of Hindustan, composed of translations and adaptations from Sanskrit.

A Sheaf Gleaned in French Fields was published in 1876 without a preface or introduction. Its 165 poems are translated from French into English by Dutt, except for one poem composed by her, "A Mon Père", and eight poems translated by her sister. At first the collection attracted little attention, though it eventually came to the notice of Edmund Gosse in 1877, who reviewed it favourably in the Examiner that year. Sheaf saw a second Indian edition in 1878 and a third edition by Kegan Paul of London in 1880, but Dutt lived to see neither of these. The second edition added 44 new poems, a portrait of Toru Dutt and her sister, and a preface by their father.

At the time of her death, she left two novels, Le Journal de Mademoiselle d’Arvers, (published posthumously in 1879), the first novel in French by an Indian writer, and Bianca, or the Young Spanish Maiden, (thought to be the first novel in English by an Indian woman writer), in addition to an unfinished volume of original poems in English and Sanskrit translations, Ancient Ballads and Legends of Hindustan. The last were among writings discovered by her father after her death in 1877.

When Ancient Ballads and Legends of Hindustan appeared posthumously in 1882, Edmund Gosse wrote an introductory memoir for it: "She brought with her from Europe a store of knowledge that would have sufficed to make an English or French girl seem learned, but which in her case was simply miraculous." The ballads are essentially Indian in genre and outlook and are the poetical attempts to reveal her return to her land. They enshrine what she had learnt of her country from books and from her people. She did not anglicize her ideas but kept close to the ethical values of the original tales while her understanding of modern life and dedication to craft helped her to make them more relevant to posterity. Some well-remembered poems from the volume include "A Sea of Foliage", "The Lotus", "Sîta", and "Our Casuarina Tree." The last in particular is often taught in high schools in India as a part of the English curriculum.

Publications
A Sheaf Gleaned in French Fields, Saptahik Sambad Press, Bhowanipore, 1876
Bianca, or the Spanish Maiden, serialized in Bengal Magazine from January to April 1878 (posthumous)
Le Journal de Mademoiselle d’Arvers, Didier, Paris, 1879 (posthumous)
Ancient Ballads and Legends of Hindustan, 1882 (posthumous)

Dutt also published translations of French poetry and literary articles in Bengal Magazine from March 1874 to March 1877. Notable magazine publications of the time include essays on Leconte de Lisle and Henry Louis Vivian Derozio in December 1874. She also published some translations from Sanskrit in Bengal Magazine (October 1876) and Calcutta Review (January 1877).

In addition, Dutt wrote a great many letters.

See also
Reviving Toru Dutt

References

External links

Annotated Ancient Ballads with Critical Introduction
Toru Dutt sonnet
PIB feature on Toru Dutt
Selected poetry of Toru Dutt

19th-century Bengalis
Indian women poets
English-language poets from India
1856 births
1877 deaths
People from Kolkata
Poets from West Bengal
Indian Christians
Indian expatriates in the United Kingdom
People from British India
19th-century Indian poets
19th-century Indian women writers
Writers from Kolkata
Indian Christian writers
Alumni of the University of Cambridge